Habidih is a village of Baheri block in Darbhanga district in the Indian state of Bihar. Its pincode is 847201.Habidih is Panchayat including many village like Baskatti, Kamar Pokhar, Katwasa, etc.

Overview 
Some important information about Habidih:

Post Office Name	Habidih B.O
Pin code	847202
Region Name	Muzaffarpur
Circle Name	Bihar
District Name	Darbhanga
Division Name	Darbhanga
Delivery Status	Delivery
Office Type	Branch Office
Police Station and block  - Baheri

Post Office Address	Habidih (Branch Office), Muzaffarpur, 
Darbhanga, Bihar 
Pin: 847201

The famous river Kamla flows down at a distance of three kilometers to the north. Many good roads run through the village. Roads in our village can be used in any season. More than 15000 people live in our village. People of different communities live here. There are both Hindus and Muslims. Most of the people earn their bread by agriculture. There are many educated person in our village. Some of them hold high offices under the Government. There are lawyers, doctors, professors and business men. Many of them live in towns. They come to the village only during holidays.famous temple-maharani- sthan in habidih.

School, Library, etc.

There is a Government Middle School in the village. There is a Government High School at a little distance. B. There is a public library in the village. There we can read many good books, monthly magazines and newspapers.

Climate

The climate of the village is excellent. The pure and invigorating air of the Kamla blows over it. The flood in the rainy season sweeps away all its accumulated impurities.

Villages in Darbhanga district